The .338 Norma Magnum is a cartridge first introduced in 2008 and came into production in 2009, designed by Norma of Sweden.

Design history
The .338 Norma Magnum was originally developed as a long-range sport shooting wildcat cartridge by the American sport shooter Jimmie Sloan with the help of Dave Kiff, owner of Pacific Tool and Gauge, who made the reamers and headspace gauges. Barrels were supplied by Rock Creek Barrel Inc.
Various twist rates were tried with 5R rifling. It was designed as a way to optimize shooting the 19.44 g (300 gr) 8.59 mm (.338 in) caliber Sierra HPBT MatchKing projectile from actions and magazines that lack the length to handle cartridges exceeding 91.44 mm (3.60 in) in overall length. The 19.44 g (300 gr) .338 caliber Sierra HPBT MatchKing projectile was not available when the .338 Lapua Magnum was originally designed (it was optimized for shooting 16.2 g (250 gr) projectiles) and .338 Lapua Magnum cartridges intended for military use are generally loaded with shorter 16.2 g (250 gr) to 18.47 g (285 gr) projectiles.
Later the design was purchased by the Swedish ammunition manufacturer Norma.
The .338 Norma Magnum cartridge was C.I.P. certified on 26 May 2010 and thus became an officially registered and sanctioned rifle cartridge.

Cartridge dimensions
The .338 Norma Magnum prior to C.I.P. certification had a shorter cartridge overall length (91.44 mm (3.60 in) compared to the cartridge overall length of the .338 Lapua Magnum (93.50 mm (3.681 in). The .338 Norma Magnum loaded with 19.44 g (300 gr) .338 caliber Sierra HPBT projectiles will have these projectile less deeply seated compared to the .338 Lapua Magnum when both cartridges are loaded to 91.44 mm (3.681 in) overall length. To achieve this the .338 Norma Magnum cartridge utilizes a shorter case (about 63.30 mm (2.492 in) with less taper and a slightly sharper shoulder angle with a slightly longer neck, resulting in about 6.5% less case capacity. However the cartridge overall lengths of the .338 Norma Magnum and .338 Lapua Magnum were, as of 2013, determined at 93.50 mm (3.681 in) by the C.I.P. rulings for these cartridges.

U.S. government market survey and ammunition availability
On June 17, 2008, the U.S. government issued a market survey to support a requirement for a Precision Sniper Rifle (PSR) to possibly replace the currently fielded Bolt Action SOF Sniper Systems MK 13 (.300 Winchester Magnum) and the M40 and M24 (7.62×51mm NATO) chambered to safely fire factory produced "non-wildcat" .338 caliber ammunition.

The .338 Norma Magnum was designed to improve upon the .338 Lapua Magnum when loaded with 19.44 g (300 gr) Sierra very-low-drag bullets in magazines and actions that restrict the .338 Lapua Magnum's maximum cartridge overall length.

In long range precision sport shooting rifles, which the .338 Norma Magnum cartridges were designed for, the chamber and throat area of the barrel are often custom made by a gunsmith for a particular cartridge, meaning the rifle (system) is consciously constructed for optimal use with a particular cartridge case and projectile combination. If projectiles with differing dimensions are to be used this will generally erode such a custom made system's accuracy potential. This makes objective comparisons between cartridges hard, since cartridges are essential parts of a larger rifle system.

Since the .338 Lapua Magnum can be loaded to its C.I.P. overall length or even somewhat longer, the practical difference between the two cartridges gradually becomes negligible. Some manufacturers of .338 Lapua Magnum actions, magazines and rifles have indicated that they intend to offer products that will allow the use of .338 Lapua Magnum cartridges that can handle overall lengths that exceed the current C.I.P. .338 Lapua Magnum maximal overall length standard of 93.50 mm (3.681 in).

In May 2017 the United States Special Operations Command, in conjunction with the United States Marine Corps issued a sources sought notice for 5,000 Lightweight Medium Machine Guns (LWMMG) chambered for .338 Norma Magnum polymer-cased ammunition.

In 2019 the U.S. Special Operations Command awarded Barrett Manufacturing a $50,000,000 contract, ordering the Barrett MRAD, designated MK22 Advanced Sniper Rifle (ASR), chambered in .338 Norma Magnum (designated XM1162) as well as 7.62×51mm NATO and .300 Norma Magnum.
In 2020 the U.S. Special Operations Command awarded SIG Sauer a contract, ordering the MG 338 machine gun chambered in .338 Norma Magnum.

Chambering availability
The .338 Norma Magnum chambering is offered for these factory rifles:

 Accuracy International ASR
 Albert Arms ALR
 Barrett MRAD (Mk 22 ASR)
 Cadex Defence CDX-33
 Desert Tech SRS-A2
 FORTMEIER M 2002
 General Dynamics Lightweight Medium Machine Gun (LWMMG)
 Remington Modular Sniper Rifle (MSR).
 Sako TRG M10 - Multi-caliber rifle 
 SIG Sauer MG 338 SLMAG - belt-fed medium machine gun which is highly analogous to the LWMMG.
 S.W.O.R.D. International Mk-18 Mod 1 Mjölnir

See also
 Norma
 .300 Norma Magnum
 .338 Lapua Magnum
 .338 Remington Ultra Magnum
 .338-378 Weatherby Magnum
 .338 Edge
 .338 Xtreme
 List of rifle cartridges
 8 mm caliber

Notes

References

External links
 Norma Ammunition Homepage
 C.I.P. TDCC datasheet 338 Norma Mag.
 Lightweight Medium Machine Gun (LWMMG)

Pistol and rifle cartridges
Magnum rifle cartridges